Events from the year 2001 in the United States.

Incumbents

Federal government 
 President: Bill Clinton (D-Arkansas) (until January 20), George W. Bush (R-Texas) (starting January 20)
 Vice President: Al Gore (D-Tennessee) (until January 20), Dick Cheney (R-Wyoming) (starting January 20)
 Chief Justice: William Rehnquist (Wisconsin) 
 Speaker of the House of Representatives: Dennis Hastert (R-Illinois)
 Senate Majority Leader:
 until January 3: Trent Lott (R-Mississippi)
 January 3–January 20: Tom Daschle (D-South Dakota)
 January 20–June 6: Trent Lott (R-Mississippi)
 starting June 6: Tom Daschle (D-South Dakota)
 Congress: 106th (until January 3), 107th (starting January 3)

Events

January 

 January 2 – Sila Calderón becomes the first female governor of US territory Puerto Rico.
 January 10 – Nevada County shootings: In Nevada County, California, 40-year-old Scott Harlan Thorpe kills three people in a shooting spree. He is later found incompetent to stand trial and declared not guilty by reason of insanity.
 January 11 – The U.S. Federal Trade Commission approves the merger of America Online and Time Warner to form AOL Time Warner.
 January 15 – UK children's stop motion animated series Bob the Builder starts its American debut for the first time on Nick Jr.
 January 16
President Bill Clinton awards former U.S. President Theodore Roosevelt a posthumous Medal of Honor for his service during the Spanish–American War; 11 of Roosevelt's descendants accept on his behalf.
A man drives a semi-trailer truck into the side of the California State Capitol building, killing the driver and damaging the building's interior.
January 18 – President Bill Clinton delivers his farewell address to the nation.
 January 20 – George W. Bush is sworn in as the 43rd President of the United States, and Dick Cheney is sworn in as Vice President of the United States.
 January 22–24 – The "Texas Seven", a group of convicts who escaped from the John B. Connally Unit in Texas, are found in Colorado.
 January 26 – Lacrosse player and coach Diane Whipple is killed by two Presa Canarios named Bane and Hera, owned by her neighbors and attorneys Marjorie Knoller and Robert Noel.
 January 28 – Super Bowl XXXV: The Baltimore Ravens defeat the New York Giants 34–7, winning their first Super Bowl title.

February 
 February 9 – The submarine  accidentally strikes and sinks the Japanese fishing vessel Ehime-Maru near Hawaii.
 February 16 – Iraq disarmament crisis: British and U.S. forces carry out bombing raids, attempting to disable Iraq's air defense network.
 February 18
 NASCAR legend Dale Earnhardt dies in a last lap crash in the 43rd annual Daytona 500.
 FBI agent Robert Hanssen is arrested and charged with spying for Russia for 15 years.
 February 19 – An Oklahoma City bombing museum is dedicated at the Oklahoma City National Memorial.
 February 23 – Isla Vista massacre: In Isla Vista, California, David Attias drives a car into five pedestrians, killing four and critically injuring one. He is later convicted of murder and declared legally insane.
 February 27 – President Bush delivers his first address to the 107th Congress.
 February 28 – The 6.8  Nisqually earthquake shook the Puget Sound region of western Washington with a maximum Mercalli intensity of VIII (Severe), causing 1 death, 400 injuries, and 1 to US$4 billion in losses.

March 
 March – The United States enters the early 2000s recession; the unemployment rate rises to 4.4%.
 March 24 – Apple Computer releases the Mac OS X next-generation operating system, with version 10.0. It goes on to be the second-most used desktop operating system with a market share of roughly 10 percent.
 March 25 – The 73rd Academy Awards, hosted by Steve Martin, are held at Shrine Auditorium in Los Angeles, with Ridley Scott's Gladiator winning five awards out of 12 nominations, including Best Picture. Steven Soderbergh is nominated twice for Best Director, winning for Traffic. The telecast garners 42.9 million viewers.
 March 28 – The Bush administration withdraws U.S. support for the 1997 Kyoto Protocol on the reduction of greenhouse gases.
 March 30 – The Fairly OddParents debuts on Nickelodeon.

April 
 April 1 – A Chinese fighter jet collides with a U.S. EP-3E surveillance aircraft, forcing it to make an emergency landing in Hainan, China. The U.S. crew is detained for 10 days, and the F-8 Chinese pilot goes missing and is presumed dead.
 April 7 – Timothy Thomas, a 19-year-old African-American, is shot by a police officer in Cincinnati, sparking riots in downtown Cincinnati from April 10 to April 12.
April 17  – The 2001 Mississippi flag referendum occurred, 64.39% of the population voted to formally adopt the 1894 U.S. state flag over the new 2001 proposed state flag design.
 April 19 – The multiple Tony Award-winning musical The Producers by Mel Brooks and Thomas Meehan, starring Nathan Lane and Matthew Broderick, opens on Broadway at the St. James Theatre.
 April 21 – The small Kansas town of Hoisington is hit by an F4 tornado, destroying one-third of the city and killing one.
 April 28 – Soyuz TM-32 lifts off from the Baikonur Cosmodrome, carrying the first space tourist, American Dennis Tito.

May 
 May 6 – Space tourist Dennis Tito returns to Earth aboard Soyuz TM-31. (Soyuz TM-32 is left docked at the International Space Station as a new lifeboat.)
 May 18 – Shrek is released in theaters.

June 

 June 5 – U.S. Senator Jim Jeffords leaves the Republican Party, an act which changes control of the United States Senate from the Republican Party to the Democratic Party.
 June 5–9 – Tropical Storm Allison produces 36 inches (900 mm) of rain in Houston, Texas, killing 22, damaging the Texas Medical Center, and causing more than US$5 billion of damage.
 June 7 – The Economic Growth and Tax Relief Reconciliation Act of 2001 is signed into law by U.S. President George W. Bush, the first of a series of acts which becomes known as the Bush tax cuts.
 June 9 – The Colorado Avalanche wins their second Stanley Cup, and Ray Bourque wins his first Cup after a lengthy career.
 June 11 – In Terre Haute, Indiana, Timothy McVeigh is executed for the Oklahoma City bombing.
 June 15 – Walt Disney Pictures' 41st feature film, Atlantis: The Lost Empire, is released. Though reception is mixed and it performs modestly at the box office, it has since become a cult favorite among fans due in part to the visual influence of comics artist Mike Mignola.
 June 19 – A missile hits a soccer field in Tal Afar, Iraq, killing 23 and wounding 11. The Iraqi government claims it was an American-British airstrike; U.S. officials say it was actually an Iraqi missile that malfunctioned.
 June 20 – Andrea Yates drowns her five children in a bath tub in Houston, Texas.

July 
 July 9 – The Thirty Mile Fire ignites in Okanogan County, Washington. Four firefighters die while battling the blaze.
 July 16 – The FBI arrests Dmitry Sklyarov at a convention in Las Vegas, Nevada, for violating a provision of the Digital Millennium Copyright Act (DMCA).
 July 18 – In Baltimore, Maryland, a 60-car train derailment occurs in a tunnel, sparking a fire that lasts days and virtually shuts down downtown Baltimore.

August 
 August 1 – Alabama Supreme Court Chief Justice Roy Moore has a  monument of the Ten Commandments installed in the Rotunda of the Judiciary Building. He is later sued to have it removed, and is eventually removed from office.
 August 2 – The House of Representatives approves oil exploration in the Alaskan Arctic National Wildlife Refuge.
 August 5 – Having acquired the Jim Henson Company's interest in the Odyssey cable network the previous year, Crown Media Holdings rebrands Odyssey as the Hallmark Channel, after Crown Media's corporate parent Hallmark Cards. The Hallmark Channel branding continues to this day.
 August 9 – President Bush announces his limited support for federal funding of research on embryonic stem cells.
August 25 – U.S. singer Aaliyah dies in a plane crash in the Bahamas.
 August 28 – The U.S. governors of New England agree with the Quebec and Atlantic Canadian premiers to the Climate Change Action Plan 2001.

September 

 September 1 – The libertarian Free State Project is founded at Yale University.
 September 2 – Adult Swim, an adult-oriented programming block, debuts on its Turner sister cable channel Cartoon Network.
 September 4 – Robert Mueller becomes the FBI's director.
 September 5 – The piece As Slow as Possible, composed by John Cage, begins. It will last 639 years, finishing in the year 2640.
 September 6 – United States v. Microsoft Corp.: The United States Justice Department announces that it no longer seeks to break up software maker Microsoft, and will instead seek a lesser antitrust penalty.
 September 10 – Donald Rumsfeld gives a speech regarding $2.3 trillion in Pentagon spending that cannot be accounted for, identifying the bureaucratic processes of the Pentagon as the biggest threat to America.
 September 11 – 9/11 attacks: Almost 3,000 people are killed in four suicide attacks at the World Trade Center in New York City; the Pentagon in Arlington, Virginia; and in rural Shanksville, Pennsylvania. The attack launches the global War on Terrorism.
 September 15 – The Queen Isabella Causeway in Texas collapses after being hit by a tugboat, killing eight.
 September 17 – The New York Stock Exchange reopens for trading after the September 11 attacks, the longest closure since the Great Depression.
 September 18 – The 2001 anthrax attacks commence as letters containing anthrax spores are mailed from Princeton, New Jersey, to ABC News, CBS News, NBC News, the New York Post, and the National Enquirer. Twenty-two people in total are exposed, with five resulting fatalities.
 September 20 – President Bush delivers a speech to a joint session of Congress, announcing the investigation into the September 11 attacks.
 September 21 – America: A Tribute to Heroes is broadcast by over 35 network and cable channels, raising over $200 million for the victims of the September 11 attacks.
 September:
 Exitium, an American grind band from Norman, Oklahoma is formed.

October 

 October 3 – 2001 Greyhound bus attack: A passenger slits the throat of the driver, causing the bus to crash near Manchester, Tennessee, killing seven people.
 October 5 – Barry Bonds of the San Francisco Giants breaks the single season home run record, with his 71st and 72nd home runs of the year.
 October 7 – The United States invades Afghanistan, accompanied by other nations participating in Operation Enduring Freedom.
 October 8 –U.S. President George W. Bush announces the establishment of the Office of Homeland Security.
 October 9 – The 2001 anthrax attacks continue as contaminated letters are mailed from Princeton, New Jersey, to U.S. Senators Tom Daschle of South Dakota and Patrick Leahy of Vermont.
 October 15 – NASA's Galileo spacecraft passes within  of Jupiter's moon Io.
 October 26 – U.S. President George W. Bush signs the USA PATRIOT Act into law.

November 

 November 1 – The New York Yankees defeat the Arizona Diamondbacks in Game 4 of the 2001 World Series to tie the series at 2 in the first World Series game to be played in the month of November. Derek Jeter's walk-off home run in the bottom of the 10th earns him the nickname "Mr. November".
 November 2 – Pixar Animation Studios' fourth feature film, Monsters, Inc., is released in theaters.
 November 4 – The Arizona Diamondbacks defeat the New York Yankees in seven games to win their first world series.
 November 5 – Andrew Bagby is murdered in Keystone State Park, Pennsylvania by his former partner Shirley Jane Turner. While awaiting trial and extraction from Canada, she gained custody of the couple's son who she then also murdered. The deaths later became the basis for the 2008 documentary Dear Zachary.
 November 12 – In New York City, American Airlines Flight 587, headed to the Dominican Republic, crashes in Queens just minutes after takeoff from the John F. Kennedy International Airport, killing all 260 on board and five on the ground.
 November 13 – War on Terror: In the first such act since World War II, U.S. President George W. Bush signs an executive order allowing military tribunals against any foreigners suspected of having connections to terrorist acts or planned acts against the United States.
November 16 – Harry Potter and the Sorcerer's Stone, directed by Chris Columbus is released in theaters as the first film of the Harry Potter film series.  
November 18 –  Nintendo releases the Nintendo Gamecube in North America.
November 29 - English musician, singer, songwriter, music and film producer, and former Beatle George Harrison dies of lung cancer in Los Angeles.
 November 30 – Gary Ridgway, a.k.a. The Green River Killer, is arrested outside the truck factory where he had worked in Renton, Washington. His arrest marks the end of one of the longest running homicide investigations in US history.

December 
 December – The unemployment rate rises to 5.7%, the highest since January 1996; the early 2000s recession ends.
 December 1 – The last Trans World Airlines flight lands at St. Louis International Airport, following TWA's purchase by American Airlines.
 December 2 – Enron files for Chapter 11 bankruptcy protection five days after Dynegy cancels a US$8.4 billion buyout bid. Enron's bankruptcy becomes the largest in U.S. history.
 December 3 – Officials announce that one of the Taliban prisoners captured after the prison uprising at Mazari Sharif, Afghanistan is John Walker Lindh, an American citizen.
 December 11 
 The United States government indicts Zacarias Moussaoui for involvement in the September 11 attacks.
 The United States Customs Service raids members of international software piracy group DrinkOrDie in Operation Buccaneer.
 December 13 – U.S. President George W. Bush announces the United States' withdrawal from the 1972 Anti-Ballistic Missile Treaty.
 December 16 – Cleveland Browns fans riot by throwing bottles after the team's 15-10 loss to the Jacksonville Jaguars following a controversial call by the referees regarding a fourth-down pass from Tim Couch.
 December 19 – The Lord of the Rings: The Fellowship of the Ring, directed by Peter Jackson, is released in theaters as the first film of The Lord of the Rings film series.
 December 22 – A flight from Paris, France to Miami, Florida is diverted to Boston, Massachusetts after passenger Richard Reid attempts to detonate explosives hidden in his shoes.
 December 27 – The People's Republic of China is granted permanent normal trade status with the United States.

Ongoing
 Iraqi no-fly zones (1991–2003)
 War in Afghanistan (2001–2021)

Undated
HEUG organization is legally incorporated.
JNBridge, a software vendor is founded in Colorado.
Sentek Global, technology service provider is founded in California.

Births

January 
 January 6 – Kenyon Martin Jr., basketball player
 January 8 – Kaash Paige, singer
 January 12 – Jena Rose, pop singer
 January 13 – Emily Grace Reaves, actress
 January 14  – Cora Jade, professional wrestler
 January 18 – Claire Engler, actress
 January 21 – Jackson Brundage, actor
 January 26 – Isaac Okoro, basketball player
 January 30 – Alex Wind, activist

February 
 February 2 – Connor Gibbs, actor
 February 8 – Jxdn singer
 February 15 – Haley Tju, American actress
 February 19 – David Mazouz, actor
 February 21 – Isabella Acres, actress

March 
 March 6
 Milo Manheim, actor
 Zhavia Ward, singer-songwriter
 March 10 – Alyssa Carson, space enthusiast and undergraduate student
 March 31
 Noah Urrea singer, actor, and model
 James Wiseman, basketball player

April 
 April 3 – Ashima Shiraishi, rock climber
 April 5 – Robbie Tucker, actor
 April 20 – Ian Alexander, actor
 April 30 – Lil Tjay, rapper

May 
 May 3 – Rachel Zegler, actress
 May 4 – Noah Beck, social media influencer
 May 14 – Jack Hughes, ice hockey player
 May 17 – AJ Mitchell, singer-songwriter and musician
 May 20 – Kyle Kashuv, conservative activist
 May 22 
 Emma Chamberlain, YouTuber
 Judah Lewis, actor
 May 23 – Matthew Lintz, actor
 May 27 – Izabela Vidovic, actress

June 
 June 1 – ppcocaine, rapper and online personality
 June 9 – Xolo Maridueña, actor
 June 10 – Sasha Obama, daughter of Barack Obama
 June 12 – John Bigelow IV, golfer
 June 19 – Ava Cantrell, actress and dancer
 June 21 – Sofie Dossi, contortionist and YouTuber
 June 24 – Mo'ne Davis, athlete

July 
 July 1 – Chosen Jacobs, actor, singer, and musician
 July 10 – Isabela Moner, actress and singer
 July 12 – Niles Fitch, actor
 July 16 – Island Boys, musical duo 
 July 18 – Hailie Deegan, stock car racing driver

August 
 August 5 – Josie Totah, actress
 August 6 – Ty Simpkins, actor
 August 8 – Bebe Wood, actress and singer
 August 12 – Dixie D'Amelio, social media influencer
 August 21 – Brooks Jensen, pro wrestler
 August 30 – Emily Bear, pianist and composer
 August 31 – Garrett Wareing, actor

September 
 September 4 – Talitha Bateman, actress
 September 6
 Aidan Laprete, singer and actor
 Terrence Clarke, basketball player (died 2021)
 September 11 – Mackenzie Aladjem, actress
 September 15 – Emma Fuhrmann, actress
 September 23 – J.I., musician
 September 25 – Cade Cunningham, basketball player

October 
 October 1 – Luna Blaise, actress and singer
 October 5 – Dalila Bela, Canadian-American actress
 October 10 – Blake Cooper, actor
 October 12
Brett Cooper, conservative commentator 
Raymond Ochoa, actor
 October 13 – Caleb McLaughlin, actor
 October 14 – Rowan Blanchard, actress
 October 19 – SpotemGottem, rapper
 October 20 – Paige Bueckers, basketball player
 October 27 – Autumn de Forest, artist

November 
 November 8 – Julia Hart, pro wrestler
 November 21 – Samantha Bailey, actress

December 
 December 8 – Tylen Jacob Williams, actor
 December 14 – Joshua Rush, actor
 December 16 – Kai Cenat, YouTuber
 December 18 – Billie Eilish, singer
 December 28 – Madison De La Garza, actress

Full date unknown
 Eliza Jane Scovill, murder victim (d. 2005)
 Zoe Yin, artist and writer

Deaths

January 

 January 1 – Ray Walston, actor (b. 1914)
 January 2 – William P. Rogers, politician (b. 1913)
 January 4 – Les Brown, jazz musician (b. 1912)
 January 5 – Nancy Parsons, actress (b. 1942)
 January 6 – Gene Taylor, media personality (b. 1947)
 January 8 – Edwin Etherington, writer, lawyer, and civil rights advocate (b. 1924)
 January 10 – John G. Schmitz, politician (b. 1930)
 January 11
Dorothy M. Horstmann, virologist who made important discoveries about polio (b. 1911)
Louis Krages, German-American racing driver and businessman (b. 1949)
 January 12
Affirmed, race horse (b. 1975)
William Hewlett, co-founder of Hewlett-Packard (b. 1913)
 January 14 – John S. Hunt, II, politician (b. 1928)
 January 15 – Bob Braun, actor (b. 1929)
 January 16
Virginia O'Brien, actress (b. 1919)
Leonard Woodcock, trade unionist and diplomat (b. 1911)
 January 17 – Gregory Corso, poet (b. 1930)
 January 19 – Maxine Mesinger, newspaper columnist (b. 1925)
 January 21
 Sandy Baron, actor (b. 1936)
 Byron De La Beckwith, white supremacist and murderer (b. 1920)
 January 22 – Roy Brown, clown (b. 1932)
 January 23 – Jack McDuff, jazz organist and bandleader (b. 1926)
 January 26
 Murray Edelman, political scientist (b. 1919)
 Diane Whipple, lacrosse player and coach and dog mauling victim (b. 1968)
 January 28
 Curt Blefary, baseball player (b. 1943)
 Sally Mansfield, actress (b. 1920)
 January 29 – Frances Bible, American operatic mezzo-soprano (b. 1919)
 January 30 – Joseph Ransohoff, neurosurgeon (b. 1915)
 January 31 – Gordon R. Dickson, science fiction writer (b. 1923)

February 

 February 4 – J. J. Johnson, jazz musician (b. 1924)
 February 6 – Arthur W. Hummel Jr., diplomat (b. 1920)
 February 7 – Dale Evans, actress, wife of Roy Rogers (b. 1912)
 February 8 – Arlene Eisenberg, author (b. 1934)
 February 9 – Herbert A. Simon, Nobel award-winning economist (b. 1916)
 February 10 – Abraham Beame, Mayor of New York City. (b. 1906)
 February 13 – Victor Veysey, American politician (b. 1915)
 February 15 – Jack McGowan, American professional golfer. (b. 1930)
 February 17 – Debbie Dean, American singer (b. 1928)
 February 18
 Dale Earnhardt, race car driver (b. 1951)
 Eddie Mathews, baseball player (b. 1931)
 February 19 – Stanley Kramer, director (b. 1913)
 February 20 – Rosemary DeCamp, actress (b. 1910)
 February 23 – Anthony Giacalone, organized crime figure (b. 1919)
 February 24 – Phil Collier, sports writer (b. 1925)

March 

 March 1 
 John Painter, American supercentenarian (b. 1888)
 Henry Wade, soldier and lawyer (b. 1914)
 March 2 – Lonnie Glosson, musician (b. 1908)
 March 4
 Glenn Hughes, musician (b. 1950)
 Jim Rhodes, politician (b. 1909)
 Harold Stassen, politician (b. 1907)
 March 8 – Edward Winter, actor (b. 1937)
 March 10 – Michael Elkins, broadcaster and journalist (b. 1917)
 March 12
 John Anderson, canoeist (b. 1915)
 Henry Lee Lucas, serial killer (b. 1936)
 Robert Ludlum, writer (b. 1927)
 March 13 – Walter Dukes, basketball player (b. 1930)
 March 15
 Durward Gorham Hall, politician, (b. 1910)
 Ann Sothern, actress (b. 1909)
 March 18 – John Phillips, American singer, guitarist, songwriter and promoter (b. 1935)
 March 21 – Billy Ray Smith, Sr., football player (b. 1934)
 March 22 – William Hanna, animator (b. 1910)
 March 26 – Brenda Helser, Olympic swimmer (b. 1924)
 March 28
 Jim Benton, footballer (b. 1916)
 George Connor, American racecar driver (b. 1906)
 March 31 – Clifford Shull, Nobel physicist (b. 1915)

April 

 April 1 – Jo-Jo Moore, baseball player (b. 1908)
 April 2 – Jennifer Syme, murder victim (b. 1972)
 April 4 – Ed Roth, artist, cartoonist, illustrator, pinstriper and custom car designer and builder (b. 1932)
 April 6 – Charles Pettigrew, singer (b. 1963)
 April 7
 David Graf, American actor (b. 1950)
 Beatrice Straight, American actress (b. 1914)
 April 8
 Safiya Henderson-Holmes, poet (b. 1950)
 Van Stephenson, singer-songwriter (b. 1953)
 April 9 – Willie Stargell, American baseball player, member of the Baseball Hall of Fame (b. 1940)
 April 10 – Richard Evans Schultes, American ethnobotanist (b. 1915)
 April 11 – Sandy Bull, folk musician and composer (b. 1941)
 April 15 – Joey Ramone, musician (b. 1951)
 April 19 – Egor Popov, Russian-born American civil engineer. (b. 1912)
 April 21 – Jack Haley Jr., director, producer and writer (b. 1933)
 April 24 – Leon Sullivan, minister and activist (b. 1922)
 April 27 – Charlie Applewhite, singer and radio host (b. 1932)
 April 28 – Precious Doe, murder victim (b. 1997)

May 
 May 4 – Eleanor Lausch Dietrich,  operatic soprano (b. 1912)
 May 5
 Charles Black, constitutional scholar (b. 1915)
 Morris Graves, expressionist painter (b. 1910)
 Cliff Hillegass, creator of CliffsNotes (b. 1917)
 May 6 – Weldon B. Gibson, economist (b. 1916)
 May 12 – Perry Como, singer (b. 1912)
 May 23 – Harry Townes, American actor. (b. 1914)
 May 26 – Anne Haney, American actress (b. 1934)
 May 31 – Arlene Francis, American actress and game show panelist (b. 1907)

June 

 June 1 – Hank Ketcham, cartoonist, creator of Dennis the Menace (b. 1920)
 June 2 – Imogene Coca, actress (b. 1908)
 June 3 – Anthony Quinn, actor (b. 1915)
 June 4 – John Hartford, musician and composer (b. 1937)
 June 10 – Mike Mentzer, bodybuilder (b. 1951)
 June 11 – Timothy McVeigh, domestic terrorist (b. 1968)
 June 17 – Donald J. Cram, Nobel chemist (b. 1919)
 June 21
 John Lee Hooker, musician (b. 1917)
 Carroll O'Connor, actor (b. 1924)
 June 22 – George Evans, cartoonist and illustrator (b. 1920)
 June 24 – William H. Sewell, sociologist (b. 1909)
 June 26 – John F. Yardley, aeronautical engineer (b. 1925)
 June 27 – Jack Lemmon, actor (b. 1925)
 June 28 – Mortimer J. Adler, philosopher (b. 1902)
 June 30 
 Chet Atkins, guitarist and record producer (b. 1924)
 Joe Henderson, jazz tenor saxophonist (b. 1937)

July 
 July 3
 Roy Nichols, guitarist (b. 1932)
 Johnny Russell, country singer (b. 1940)
 July 4 – Keenan Milton, skateboarder (b. 1974)
 July 17 – Katharine Graham, American publisher (b. 1917)
 July 22 – Bob Ferguson, American country music songwriter and record producer (b. 1927)
 July 28 – John Easton, American professional baseball player (b. 1933)
 July 31 – Poul Anderson, writer (b. 1926)

August 
 August 8 – Big Ed, rapper (b. 1971)
 August 10 – Lou Boudreau, baseball player (b. 1917)
 August 11 – Kevin Kowalcyk, (b. 1998)
 August 24 – George Benson (b. 1919)
 August 25
 Aaliyah, singer and actress, died in plane crash in Marsh Harbour, Abaco Islands, The Bahamas (b. 1979)
 John Chambers, American make-up artist (b. 1922)
 John L. Nelson, American jazz musician (b. 1916)
 Diana Golden, American disabled ski racer (b. 1963)
 August 30 – Julie Bishop, film and television actress (b. 1914)
 August 31 – Crash Davis, American professional baseball player (b. 1919)

September 
 September 4 – Pete Brown, footballer (b. 1930)
 September 5 – Cawood Ledford, American radio announcer (Kentucky Wildcats) (b. 1926)
 September 7 – Glenn Thompson, American book publisher and activist (b. 1940)
 September 11
 Alice Stewart Trillin, author and film producer (b. 1938)
At least 3,000 people died in the terrorist attacks of September 11, including but not limited to:
Todd Beamer, American airline passenger, United Airlines Flight 93 (b. 1969)
Berry Berenson, actress and photographer. Passenger of American Airlines Flight 11 (b. 1947)
Carolyn Beug, American filmmaker and video producer. Passenger of American Airlines Flight 11 (b. 1952)
Bill Biggart, photojournalist (b. 1947)
Mark Bingham, American airline passenger, United Airlines Flight 93 (b. 1970)
Ronald Paul Bucca, American fire marshal (b. 1953)
Charles Burlingame, airline pilot, American Airlines Flight 77 (b. 1949)
Tom Burnett, American airline passenger, United Airlines Flight 93 (b. 1963)
William E. Caswell, American physicist. Passenger of American Airlines Flight 77 (b. 1947)
Kevin Cosgrove, business executive (b. 1955)
Welles Crowther, investment banker (b. 1977)
William M. Feehan, Deputy fire commissioner (b. 1929)
Wilson Flagg, Rear Admiral (b. 1938)
Peter J. Ganci Jr., Chief of the Fire Department of New York (b. 1946)
Barbara Olson, lawyer and media personality (b. 1955)
Christopher Amoroso, police officer (b. 1972)
David Angell, producer (b. 1946)
Jeremy Glick, American airline passenger, United Airlines Flight 93 (b. 1970)
Lauren Grandcolas, American author. Passenger of United Airlines Flight 93 (b. 1962)
Nezam Hafiz, American cricketer (b. 1969)
Mohammad Salman Hamdani, American research technician (b. 1977)
LeRoy Homer Jr., American airline pilot, United Airlines Flight 93 (b. 1965)
Charles Edward Jones, American astronaut. Passenger of American Airlines Flight 11 (b. 1953)
Mychal Judge, Chaplain of the Fire Department of New York (b. 1933)
Neil David Levin, executive director of the Port Authority of New York and New Jersey (b. 1954)
Daniel M. Lewin, co-founder of Akamai Technologies. Passenger of American Airlines Flight 11 (b. 1970)
Eamon McEneaney, American lacrosse player (b. 1954)
Timothy Maude, Lieutenant General, U.S. Army (b. 1947)
John Ogonowski, American pilot, American Airlines Flight 11 (b. 1948)
John P. O'Neill, Counterterrorism expert (b. 1952)
Betty Ong, American flight attendant, American Airlines Flight 11 (b. 1956)
Orio Palmer, American firefighter (b. 1956)
Dominick Pezzulo, American police officer (b. 1965)
Sneha Anne Philip, American physician, presumed to have been a victim of the attacks (b. 1970)
Rick Rescorla, World Trade Center security chief for Morgan Stanley and Dean Witter (b. 1939)
Michael Richards, Jamaican-born American sculptor (b. 1963)
Victor Saracini, American pilot, United Airlines Flight 175 (b. 1978)
Abraham Zelmanowitz, American computer programmer (b. 1945)
Madeline Amy Sweeney, flight attendant, American Airlines Flight 11 (b. 1965)
 September 15 – Richard Fegley, professional photographer (b. 1936)
 September 25 – John Powers, American professional baseball player (born 1929)
 September 29 – Gloria Foster, American actress (born 1933)

October 
 October 3 – SoFaygo, American rapper 
 October 5 – Mike Mansfield, American politician and diplomat. (b. 1903)
 October 9 – Dagmar, American actress, model and television personality (b. 1921)
 October 14 – Zhang Xueliang, Chinese ruler of Manchuria, died in Honolulu, Hawaii (b. 1901)
 October 19 – Joe Murray, American baseball player (b. 1921)

November 

 November 5 – Milton William Cooper, American author and radio host (b. 1943)
 November 6 – John Simon White, Austrian-born American opera director. (b. 1940)
 November 7 – Bobby Bass, stunt performer (b. 1936)
 November 10 – Ken Kesey, American author (b. 1935)
 November 11 – Frederick Allen, politician (b. 1914)
 November 13 – Panama Francis, American swing jazz drummer (b. 1918)
 November 17
John M. Dawson, computational physicist (b. 1930)
 Harrison A. Williams, politician (b. 1920)
 November 21 – Fritz Herzog, German-born American mathematician (b. 1903)
 November 22 – Mary Kay Ash, American businesswoman (b. 1918)
 November 29 – George Harrison, English guitarist, lead guitarist of the Beatles (b. 1943)

December 
 December 13
 Chuck Schuldiner, singer and guitarist (born 1967)
 Rufus Thomas, singer (born 1917)
 December 30
 Ray Patterson, animator, producer, and director (born 1911)
 Frankie Gaye, soul musician (born 1941)
 Eileen Heckart, Oscar-winning actor (born 1919)

See also
 2001 in Afghanistan
 2001 in American soccer
 2001 in American television
 List of American films of 2001
 Timeline of United States history (1990–2009)

References

External links
 

 
2000s in the United States
United States
United States
Articles containing video clips
Years of the 21st century in the United States